Corporal Lewis Kenneth Bausell (April 17, 1924 – September 18, 1944) was a United States Marine and posthumous recipient of the United States' highest military honor — the Medal of Honor — for his sacrifice of life, "above and beyond the call of duty", during World War II. During combat at Peleliu, he covered an exploding Japanese hand grenade in order to protect his comrades, and died of his wounds three days later. Bausell was the only enlisted Marine from the Nation's capital, Washington, D.C. to be awarded the Medal of Honor for actions during World War II.

Biography

Early years
Lewis Kenneth Bausell was born in Pulaski, Virginia on April 17, 1924. Moving to Washington, he attended the local public schools and then went to work as a bookbinder for Ransdell, Incorporated, a Washington printer. He was employed there at the time of the Japanese attack on Pearl Harbor December 7, 1941.

Marine Corps, World War II service
The week following the Pearl Harbor attack, on December 15, Bausell enlisted in the U.S. Marine Corps for a four-year period. After training at the Marine Corps Recruit Depot, Parris Island, South Carolina, he joined the 1st Marine Division in New River, North Carolina. Bausell was promoted to Private First Class on March 25, 1942, and to Corporal on June 1, 1942. On May 20, 1942, the 5th Marines sailed for the Pacific arriving at Wellington, New Zealand, on June 20, 1942, the marines immediately began preparations for landing in the Solomon Islands.

Corporal Bausell took part in the initial landings on Guadalcanal and fought there for four months before going southward to Melbourne, Australia. In the spring of the next year he sailed for New Guinea.

Serving with the 5th Marine Regiment of the 1st Marine Division, Cpl Bausells prepared for the next campaign, in New Guinea and then made the Cape Gloucester, New Britain, landing three days after the original invasion in December 1943. With that campaign concluded, the division returned to the Solomon Islands and went to Pavuvu Island for rest, rehabilitation, and preparation for another campaign.

The Peleliu landing took place on September 15, 1944, and the 5th Marines were the left flank regiment on the division front. In the first hour of action, the assault waves fought their way 100 yards inland to the top of a small coral ridge, one of dozens on the island. Cpl Bausell, who, one month earlier had been examined and found qualified for promotion to the rank of sergeant, was in a squad assigned to clean out one of the many enemy-infested caves which honeycombed the ridge.

On one side of the cave, a Marine second lieutenant and several of his men used a flame thrower to force the enemy out while Cpl Bausell and several others waited with rifles ready. Two men stood at the entrance, firing into the cave. A Japanese soldier charged out holding a grenade against his body and lunged toward the small band of Marines. The grenade exploded injuring several Marines and killing the attacker.

As the remaining enemy combatants exited the cave, a grenade was thrown amongst the Marines. Cpl Bausell heroically threw himself on the grenade and saved the lives of his fellow Marines.

Cpl Bausell was evacuated to a hospital ship where after three days, on September 18, he succumbed to his wounds. He was buried at sea.

Decorations and honors
The Medal of Honor, posthumously awarded the Marine by President Franklin D. Roosevelt, was presented to his mother and father in the Navy Department in Washington, D.C. by Secretary of the Navy James Forrestal on June 11, 1945. Gen Alexander A. Vandegrift, then Commandant of the Marine Corps, was present for the ceremony, as were Bausell's sisters and one sister-in-law.

In addition to the Medal of Honor, Cpl Bausell was posthumously awarded the Purple Heart; Presidential Unit Citation; Asiatic-Pacific Campaign Medal with four bronze stars and the World War II Victory Medal.

 

She was a Gearing-class destroyer who served in the United States Navy during the Korean War and the Vietnam War.

Medal of Honor citation
The President of the United States takes pride in presenting the MEDAL OF HONOR posthumously to

for service as set forth in the following CITATION:
For conspicuous gallantry and intrepidity at the risk of his life above and beyond the call of duty while serving with the First Battalion, Fifth Marines, First Marine Division, during action against enemy Japanese forces on Peleliu Island, Palau Group, September 15, 1944. Valiantly placing himself at the head of his squad, Corporal Bausell led the charge forward against a hostile pillbox which was covering a vital sector of the beach and, as the first to reach the emplacement, immediately started firing his automatic into the aperture while the remainder of his men closed in on the enemy. Swift to act as a Japanese grenade was hurled into their midst, Corporal Bausell threw himself on the deadly weapon, taking the full blast of the explosion and sacrificing his own life to save his men. His unwavering loyalty and inspiring courage reflect the highest credit upon Corporal Bausell and the United States Naval Service. He gallantly gave his life for his country.
/S/ FRANKLIN D. ROOSEVELT

See also

List of Medal of Honor recipients
List of Medal of Honor recipients for World War II

Notes

References

Further reading

1924 births
1944 deaths
United States Marine Corps personnel killed in World War II
United States Marine Corps Medal of Honor recipients
Military personnel from Washington, D.C.
United States Marine Corps non-commissioned officers
People from Pulaski, Virginia
World War II recipients of the Medal of Honor
Burials at sea
Deaths by hand grenade